Van Exel is a surname. Notable people with the surname include:

 Nick Van Exel (born 1971), American basketball player and coach
 Anousjka van Exel (born 1974), Dutch tennis player

Surnames of Dutch origin